Joe Laurie Jr. (February 24, 1892 – April 29, 1954) was an American vaudeville monologist who later performed on radio and on Broadway. He was born in New York City.

On radio he was one of the comedic panelists on the popular joke-telling series, Can You Top This? with Edward Hastings Ford. He also portrayed the character of Sniffy on the Mutual daytime drama, We Were Always Young.

Books

Laurie's jokes were part of Cream of the Crop (Grosset and Dunlap, 1947) along with other members of the Can You Top This? team. He collaborated with Abel Green on the show business history, Show Biz: From Vaude to Video (1951) and then followed with his memoir, Vaudeville: From the Honky-Tonks to the Palace (1953).

Family

Laurie's first wife was his vaudeville partner, Aleen Bronson, in the act, Laurie & Bronson. During the 1940s, Laurie and his second wife, Nellie Butcher (1922–1954), stage named June Tempest, lived in Manhattan. He was survived by his son, Joseph Bryant Hughes Laurie.

Joe Laurie Jr. died in New York City in 1954, aged 63, from undisclosed causes.

References

External links
 Photo of Joe Laurie Jr.
 Joe Laurie Jr. papers, 1877–1954 [bulk 1912–1954], held by the Billy Rose Theatre Division, New York Public Library for the Performing Arts
 Joe Laurie Jr. drawings collection, 1914–1952, held by the Billy Rose Theatre Division, New York Public Library for the Performing Arts
 Annie Hart papers and scrapbooks, 1922–1947 , held by the Billy Rose Theatre Division, New York Public Library for the Performing Arts. Includes correspondence from Joe Laurie Jr.

Laurie Jr., Joe
1954 deaths
1892 births
Members of The Lambs Club